Ann Diamond  is a Canadian poet, short story writer, and novelist.

Diamond's poetic tale, A Nun's Diary, was adapted for theatre by Robert LePage and presented in Montreal and Toronto at Theatre Passe Muraille.

In 2014 Diamond wrote a memoir, The Man Next Door, about her friend and neighbour Leonard Cohen.

Selected works
Poetry
 "Lil" (1977)
 "A Nun's Diary" (1984)
 "Terrorist Letters" (1992)

Short stories
 "Snakebite" (1989)
 "Evil Eye" (1994) (winner of the Hugh MacLennan Prize for Fiction)

Novels
 "Mona's Dance" (1988)
 "Dead white males" (2000)
 "Static Control" (2005)

Memoir
 "My Cold War" (2007)

See also

List of Canadian poets
List of Canadian writers
List of Quebec writers
Geist (magazine)
Quebec Writers' Federation Awards

References

External links
Author's web site
QWF Literary Database of Quebec English-language authors
Ann Diamond. The Canadian Encyclopedia, Historica Canada. Archived at the Wayback Machine.
Ann Diamond at Geist.com
Ann Diamond with John Asfour

1951 births
Living people
20th-century Canadian novelists
20th-century Canadian poets
21st-century Canadian novelists
Anglophone Quebec people
Canadian women novelists
Canadian women poets
Concordia University alumni
Canadian women short story writers
Writers from Montreal
20th-century Canadian women writers
21st-century Canadian women writers
20th-century Canadian short story writers
21st-century Canadian short story writers